Events from the year 1477 in Ireland.

Incumbent
Lord: Edward IV

Events
Garret More, the Great Earl of Kildare starts his rule (ruled until his death in 1513).
Christopher Columbus, a Genoese merchant, visits Galway on a trading voyage.

References

 
1470s in Ireland
Ireland
Years of the 15th century in Ireland